Pope Celestine III (r. 1191–98) created eleven cardinals in six consistories. The exact dates for some of these consistories are not known.

April or May 1191
 Niccolò Bobone (Cardinal-Deacon of Santa Maria in Cosmedin)

2 June 1191
 Roffredo dell'Isola O.S.B. Cas. (Cardinal-Priest of Santi Marcellino e Pietro)

1191
 Guido (Cardinal-Priest of San Marco)
 Giacomo Cesarini (Cardinal-Priest of Santa Prassede)

May 1192
 Albert of Louvain (Cardinal-Deacon)

20 February 1193
 Giovanni di San Paolo O.S.B. (Cardinal-Deacon)
 Fidanzio (Cardinal-Priest of San Marcello)
 Pietro Capuano (Cardinal-Deacon of Santa Maria in Via Lata)
 Bobobe (Cardinal-Deacon of San Teodoro)
 Cencio Savelli (Cardinal-Deacon of Santa Lucia in Orphea)

1195
 Simon de Limbourg (Cardinal-Deacon)

Notes and references

Sources

College of Cardinals
Celestine III
12th-century Catholicism
12th-century cardinals